Hedgesville High School is located in Hedgesville, West Virginia, United States.  Enrollment is around 1,300.  Its mascot is the Eagle, and its colors are blue and gold.

History
Hedgesville High School began as a one-room log schoolhouse in 1866.  The building was torn down and a new brick building was erected in 1884.  A new high school building was erected in 1976.

In 2004, U.S. President George W. Bush visited the school.

Athletics

The school is involved in WSSAC Secondary Schools for sports affiliation. The track team has won three state titles, in 1995, 2009, and again in 2017. The boys' basketball team won the 2012 AAA West Virginia State Championship. The baseball team also won state in 2013.

Hedgesville's marching band is part of the Tournament of Bands marching band competition program. On October 22, 2011, the band scored an 88.0 at their Chapter 13/WV State Championship competition at Lewis County High School. At the Atlantic Coast Championship tournament on October 30, 2011, the band scored an 86.55.

Notable alumni
Saira Blair - class of 2014; elected to the West Virginia House of Delegates in November 2014 at age 18
QJ Peterson, basketball player 
Gale Catlett - former Head basketball coach for West Virginia University
Chase DeLauter, baseball player for the Cleveland Guardians

References

External links

 
West Virginia Dept. of Education directory listing for Hedgesville High School

Public high schools in West Virginia
Schools in Berkeley County, West Virginia